Gerard Moreno Balagueró (born 7 April 1992) is a Spanish professional footballer who plays as a striker for La Liga club Villarreal and the Spain national team.

In his career, he has played for Villarreal, Mallorca and Espanyol, winning the 2021 Europa League and two Zarra Trophies with the first club.

Moreno made his full debut for Spain in 2019, being part of the squad at UEFA Euro 2020.

Club career

Villarreal
Born in Santa Perpètua de Mogoda, Barcelona, Catalonia, Moreno joined Villarreal in 2010 from local Badalona. On 5 March 2011, while still a junior, he made his debut with the reserves, appearing as a late substitute in a 1–2 home loss against Rayo Vallecano. During his early spell he also represented the third team, scoring at an astonishing rate in Tercera División.

Moreno scored his first goal as a professional on 10 December 2011, contributing to a 3–1 Segunda División home victory over Xerez. He played his first official game with Villarreal's main squad roughly one year later, starting in a 1–0 loss at Elche. He scored his first goal for the Yellow Submarine on 25 January 2013, opening a 3–0 defeat of Sabadell.

On 8 July 2013, Moreno signed with Mallorca of the second tier in a season-long loan. He subsequently returned to Villarreal, being definitely promoted to the first team now in La Liga.

Moreno made his debut in the Spanish top flight on 14 September 2014, starting in a 0–0 away draw against Granada. He scored his first goal in the competition ten days later, in a 1–1 draw at Eibar.

Espanyol
On 13 August 2015, Moreno signed a five-year deal with fellow league side Espanyol, who bought 50% of his rights for a €1.5 million fee. The following 23 January, he scored in a 2–2 home draw against his former team before being sent off.

Moreno netted 16 times in the 2017–18 season, in an 11th-place finish.

Villarreal return
Moreno returned to Villarreal on 12 June 2018, agreeing to a five-year contract. Having retained 50% of the player's rights previously, his former club paid Espanyol €20 million in the transfer to buy back the remaining 50% and acquire the player outright.

Moreno finished 2019–20 with 18 league goals, thus winning the Zarra Trophy. He renewed the accolade the following season with 23 and a team-best seven assists, scoring a further seven times in their victorious run in the UEFA Europa League; he was later voted the Europa League's Player of the Season, beating Manchester United duo Bruno Fernandes and Edinson Cavani.

On 10 August 2021, Moreno signed a new six-year deal. The following day, he scored in the UEFA Super Cup against Chelsea, surpassing Giuseppe Rossi to become the club's all-time top scorer at 83 goals.

Moreno featured much less in the 2021–22 campaign, due to injury problems.

International career
Moreno was never capped for Spain at any youth level. He made his senior debut on 15 October 2019, playing the entire 1–1 draw in Sweden for the UEFA Euro 2020 qualifiers. One month later, for the same competition and also as a starter, he scored his first goal in a 7–0 rout of Malta in Cádiz for the already qualified hosts. On 18 November, he added a brace in the 5–0 victory over Romania, being included in Luis Enrique's 24-man squad for the finals on 24 May 2021.

Career statistics

Club

International

Spain score listed first, score column indicates score after each Moreno goal

Honours
Espanyol
Supercopa de Catalunya: 2016

Villarreal
UEFA Europa League: 2020–21

Individual
Zarra Trophy: 2019–20, 2020–21
UEFA Europa League top scorer: 2020–21 (joint – 7 goals)
UEFA Europa League Squad of the Season: 2020–21
UEFA Europa League Player of the Season: 2020–21
UEFA Europa League top assists provider: 2020–21 (joint – 5 assists)
UEFA Super Cup Man of the Match: 2021

References

External links

1992 births
Living people
People from Vallès Occidental
Sportspeople from the Province of Barcelona
Spanish footballers
Footballers from Catalonia
Association football forwards
La Liga players
Segunda División players
Segunda División B players
Tercera División players
CF Damm players
Villarreal CF C players
Villarreal CF B players
Villarreal CF players
RCD Mallorca players
RCD Espanyol footballers
UEFA Europa League winning players
Spain international footballers
UEFA Euro 2020 players
Catalonia international footballers